

Adjectival tourism is the numerous niche or specialty travel forms of tourism; each with its own adjective.

Examples of the more common niche tourism markets include:

Adventure and extreme
 Adventure tourism
 Extreme tourism
 Space tourism

Culture and the arts
 Bookstore tourism
 Cultural tourism
 Heritage tourism
 Literary tourism
 Music tourism
 Pop-culture tourism
 Tolkien tourism

Extralegal
 Drug tourism
 Female sex tourism
 Male sex tourism
 Suicide tourism

Food and drink
 Culinary tourism
 Wine tourism

Historical
 Archaeological tourism
 Atomic tourism
 Genealogy tourism
 Militarism heritage tourism

Low-impact
 CouchSurfing
 Ecotourism
 Geotourism
 Sustainable tourism

Medical and dental
 Dental tourism
 Fertility tourism
 Medical tourism
 Wellness tourism

Miscellaneous
 City tourism
 Accessible tourism
 Garden tourism
 Libel tourism
 Sports tourism

Nature and rural
 Agritourism
 Jungle tourism
 Rural tourism
 Wildlife tourism

Religious
 Christian tourism
 Halal tourism
 Kosher tourism
 Religious tourism

Science and Education
Astronomy tourism

Voyeuristic
 Dark tourism
 Disaster tourism
 Jihadi tourism
Slum tourism
 War tourism

Water-related
 Nautical tourism
 Shark tourism

References

https://web.archive.org/web/20150621054037/http://cultural-heritage-tourism.com/what-are-adjectival-specialty-niche-tourisms/

http://travelgeography.blogspot.com/2017/02/adjectival-specialty-niche-conceptual.html

Adjectival tourisms